Frederick McCarthy (1890 – before 1980) was an English footballer who played for Stoke.

Career
McCarthy was born in Liverpool and played football with Bury before joining Stoke in 1914. He spent the 1914–15 at Stoke where he scored nine goals in ten matches. He later played for Stafford Rangers.

Career statistics

References

1890 births
Year of death missing
English footballers
Footballers from Liverpool
Association football forwards
Bury F.C. players
Stoke City F.C. players
Stafford Rangers F.C. players
Southern Football League players
Date of birth missing
Place of death missing